John Francis Kurtzke (September 14, 1926 – December 1, 2015) was a  neuroepidemiologist and Professor of Neurology at Georgetown University who is best known for his creation of the Expanded Disability Status Scale and for his research on multiple sclerosis (MS).
After graduating from Cornell University Medical College in 1952, Dr. Kurtzke started his career in the field of Neurology as Chief of the Neurology Service at the Veteran’s Affairs (VA) Medical Centers in Coatesville, Pennsylvania, from 1956 to 1963, and then in Washington, DC, from 1963 to 1995, where he became Professor of Neurology at Georgetown University. At the time of his death, he held the title of Professor Emeritus at Georgetown University.

Most of his work dealt with multiple sclerosis (MS). In particular, Dr Kurtzke is widely known for his Expanded Disability Status Scale or EDSS  (a method of quantifying disability in multiple sclerosis) and for his pioneering work in the field of neuroepidemiology, a branch of epidemiology he helped to establish in 1967 with Dr. Len Kurland and Dr. Milton Alter.

He was a leading world expert on geographical patterns of prevalence of multiple sclerosis. Kurtzke's results have played a major role in promoting the study of the viral component of MS susceptibility.

The author of more than 200 peer-reviewed articles, he has received several awards including the 1999 Charcot Award by the Multiple Sclerosis International Federation and the 1997 Dystel prize for MS research awarded by the American Academy of Neurology.

In 2009, the Consortium of Multiple Sclerosis Centers (CMSC) and the American Academy of Neurology Foundation (AANF) have created the John F. Kurtzke, MD, FAAN, Clinician-Scientist Development Three-Year Award, a jointly-sponsored fellowship in multiple sclerosis research, "to honor the contributions of Dr. Kurtzke and inspire new MS healthcare professionals to follow in his path."

Like Klaus Lauer, J. Kurtzke has dedicated a large part of his work to the study of MS in the Faroe Islands, with extensive studies dealing with the British occupation of the islands, starting what the New York Times called the MS "medical detective story". He died on December 1, 2015.

References

External links 

 
 
 
 portrait by E. Granieri. Once on page, press "look inside" icon
 
 Audio podcast and transcript of interview by Consortium of MS centers
 
 
 
 One of the first papers of Kurtzke (1954)
 
 
 
 
 
 
 
 
 
 
 
 
 
 
 
 

2015 deaths
Scientists from New York City
People from Brooklyn
Weill Cornell Medical College alumni
Georgetown University Medical Center faculty
1926 births
American neurologists
American public health doctors
United States Navy Medical Corps officers